"If I Didn't Have You" is a song written by Skip Ewing and Max D. Barnes, and recorded by American country music singer Randy Travis.  It was released in August 1992 as the lead-off single from his  Greatest Hits, Volume One compilation album.  The song became Travis' thirteenth Number One single on the Hot Country Singles & Tracks (now Hot Country Songs) chart.

The song's verses are written with an unusual 7/4 meter, and the chorus is in common 4/4 time.

Critical reception
Deborah Evans Price, of Billboard magazine reviewed the song favorably, saying that Travis "showcases his George Jones influence on a frolicking copyright, but he seems to strain in places." She goes on to call the song "hip musicianship."

Music video
The music video was directed by Jim Shea and premiered in mid-1992.

Chart positions
"If I Didn't Have You" debuted at number 65 on the U.S. Billboard Hot Country Singles & Tracks for the week of August 15, 1992.

Year-end charts

References

Allmusic
CMT

1992 singles
Randy Travis songs
Songs written by Skip Ewing
Songs written by Max D. Barnes
Song recordings produced by Kyle Lehning
Warner Records singles
1992 songs